Sir Harry Percy Brown  (28 December 18785 June 1967) was a senior Australia public servant. He was Director-General of the Postmaster-General's Department from 1923 until 1939.

Life and career
Harry Brown was born in South Hylton, County Durham, England on 28 December 1878 to Sarah Emma and George Brown.

He was appointed Director-General of Posts and Telegraphs, heading the Postmaster-General's Department, in December 1923. His salary on appointment was significantly more than that of any other person in the Commonwealth Public Service.

On 5 June 1967, Brown died in Sydney.

Awards
Brown was appointed a Member of the Order of the British Empire in 1918, a Companion of the Order of St Michael and St George in 1934, and was knighted in 1938.

References

1878 births
1967 deaths
Australian public servants
Australian Companions of the Order of St Michael and St George
Australian Members of the Order of the British Empire
English emigrants to Australia